Jan Małkowiak (May 20, 1919 in Gelsenkirchen, Germany – July 26, 1991 in Gniezno) was a Polish field hockey player who competed in the 1952 Summer Olympics.  He played as back in the only match for Poland in the main tournament as well as in one match in the consolation tournament.

External links
 
profile 

1919 births
1991 deaths
Polish male field hockey players
Olympic field hockey players of Poland
Field hockey players at the 1952 Summer Olympics
Sportspeople from Gelsenkirchen
People from the Province of Westphalia
German emigrants to Poland